The Am386 CPU is a 100%-compatible clone of the Intel 80386 design released by AMD in March 1991. It sold millions of units, positioning AMD as a legitimate competitor to Intel, rather than being merely a second source for x86 CPUs (then termed 8086-family).

Features

History and design

While the AM386 CPU was essentially ready to be released prior to 1991, Intel kept it tied up in court. AMD had previously been a second-source manufacturer of Intel's Intel 8086, Intel 80186 and Intel 80286 designs, and AMD's interpretation of the contract, made up in 1982, was that it covered all derivatives of them. Intel, however, claimed that the contract only covered the 80286 and prior processors and forbade AMD the right to manufacture 80386 CPUs in 1987. After a few years in the courtrooms, AMD finally won the case and the right to sell their Am386 in March 1991. This also paved the way for competition in the 80386-compatible 32-bit CPU market and so lowered the cost of owning a PC.

While Intel's 386 CPUs had topped out at 33 MHz in 1989, AMD introduced 40 MHz versions of both its 386DX and 386SX out of the gate, extending the lifespan of the architecture. In the following two years the AMD 386DX-40 saw popularity with small manufacturers of PC clones and with budget-minded computer enthusiasts because it offered near-80486 performance at a much lower price than an actual 486. Generally the 386DX-40 performs nearly on par with a 25 MHz 486 due to the 486 needing fewer clock cycles per instruction, thanks to its tighter pipelining (more overlapping of internal processing) in combination with an on-chip CPU cache. However, its 32-bit 40 MHz data bus gave the 386DX-40 comparatively good memory and I/O performance.

Am386DX data
 32-bit data bus, can select between either a 32-bit bus or a 16-bit bus by use of the BS16 input
 32-bit physical address space, 4 Gbyte physical memory address space
 fetches code in four-byte units
 released in March 1991

Am386DE data
 32-bit data bus, can select between either a 32-bit bus or a 16-bit bus by use of the BS16 input
 32-bit physical address space, 4 Gbyte physical memory address space
 fetches code in four-byte units
 no paging unit

AM386 SX
In 1991 AMD also introduced advanced versions of the 386SX processor - again not as a second source production of the Intel chip, but as a reverse engineered pin compatible version. In fact, it was AMD's first entry in the x86 market other than as a second source for Intel. AMD 386SX processors were available at faster clock speeds at the time they were introduced and still cheaper than the Intel 386SX. Produced in 0.8 μm technology and using a static core, their clock speed could be dropped down to 0 MHz, consuming just some mWatts. Power consumption was up to 35% lower than with Intel's design and even lower than the 386SL's, making the AMD 386SX the ideal chip for both desktop and mobile computers. The SXL versions featured advanced power management functions and used even less power.

Am386SX data
 16-bit data bus, no bus sizing option
 24-bit physical address space, 16 Mbyte physical memory address space
 prefetch unit reads two bytes as one unit (like the 80286).

80387 coprocessor
Floating point performance of the Am386 could be boosted with the addition of a 80387DX or 80387SX coprocessor, although performance would still not approach that of the on-chip FPU of the 486DX. This made the Am386DX a suboptimal choice for scientific applications and CAD using floating point intensive calculations. However, both were niche markets in the early 1990s and the chip sold well, first as a mid-range contender, and then as a budget chip. Although motherboards using the older 386 CPUs often had limited memory expansion possibilities and therefore struggled under Windows 95's memory requirements, boards using the Am386 were sold well into the mid-1990s; at the end as budget motherboards for those who were only interested in running MS-DOS or Windows 3.1x applications. 
The Am386 and its low-power successors were also popular choices for embedded systems, for a much longer period than their life span as PC processors.

References

External links

  AMD.com: Am386 Family 32-bit Processors
 AMD Am386SX/SXL/SXLV Datasheet
 cpu-collection.de: Pictures
 AMD: 30 Years of Pursuing the Leader. Part 2
 
 AMD Am386 Microprocessors for Personal Computers Datasheet 15021 and 15022
 AMD (Advanced Micro Devices) AM386DE-33KC 32-BIT, 33 MHz, MICROPROCESSOR, PQFP132 pdf datasheet 

Am386
X86 microarchitectures